Phyllis Eu Cheng Li, née Chia (also known as Mrs Robert Lee) was a city councilor that became the first woman to be elected into public office in Singapore. She joined the Municipal Commission in 1949 and was re-elected twice representing the Progressive Party. During her time in office she worked to strengthen consumer rights and to help involve women in politics. She was formally inducted into the Singapore Women's Hall of Fame in 2014 for her legacy.

Early life
Chia Cheng Li was born in 1914 to managing director of United Motor Works  Chia Yee Soh and his first wife Seow Guat Eng. She went to Methodist Girls' School and joined the Teachers’ Training College before transferring to Raffles College a year later. Graduating in 1935 she taught at St Margaret's Church of England School until the outbreak of World War II when her family fled to Australia. Here she studied at the University of Sydney and took part in a referendum before the family returned to Singapore in 1946. Upon her return she worked for Zenana Mission School and later Paya Lebar Methodist Girls’ School in 1953. In 1935 she married teacher Robert Eu and took his name.

Political career
Phyllis Eu Cheng Li ran for election to the Singapore Municipal Commission in 1949 representing the Progressive Party in the Western ward. She won the third seat with 26.0% of the votes and became the first woman elected to public office. The same year she was re-elected again during the 1939 December election where she increased her share to 62.8% of the votes. In 1951, the Singapore Municipal Commission was replaced with the a City Council after Singapore was reclassified as a British city. A year later Li won her third election in the same ward with a 10.6% majority.

When the Progressive Party and the Democratic Party merged into the Liberal Socialist Party in 1956 Li became and independent, however stood down at the December 1957 election and retired from politics.

Election results

References

1914 births
2004 deaths
Progressive Party (Singapore) politicians
Singaporean women in politics